Gobind Pura is one of the oldest residential areas in Faisalabad, Punjab, Pakistan. It is centrally located near the city's "Ghanta Ghar" (Clock Tower). Located on the main Narwala Road, Gobind Pura is located opposite the Agriculture University of Faisalabad and adjacent to  Jinnah Colony.

Gobind Pura's buildings represent both the old and new architecture. The main road situated between Gobind Pura and Jinnah Colony (Gulberg Road) has been converted into a highly commercialized area with several hospitals, clinics, restaurants, schools, and bakeries and outlets of various national and international brands. Four mosques are located in the area as well.

References

Neighborhoods of Faisalabad
Memorials to Guru Gobind Singh